Microdrillia crispata is an extinct species of sea snail, a marine gastropod mollusk in the family Borsoniidae.

There is one subspecies: Microdrillia crispata vatreni Della Bella & Tabanelli, 1986

Description
The length of the shell attains 5 mm. The shell is acuminately turreted. The whorls are convex, with numerous prominent revolving carinae, the interstices narrow, obliquely longitudinally striated. The color of the shell is white, the apex tinged with fuscous. The siphonal canal is very short. The sinus is ample.

Distribution
This extinct marine species has been found in Northeast Brasil. It also occurred in the Upper Pliocene of Romagna, Italy.

References

 Chirli (C.) & Richard (C.), 2008 Les Mollusques plaisanciens de la Côte d’Azur, p. 1–128

External links
  Bouchet P., Kantor Yu.I., Sysoev A. & Puillandre N. (2011) A new operational classification of the Conoidea. Journal of Molluscan Studies 77: 273–308
 Microdrillia crispata
 Cesare Tabanelli, ASSOCIAZIONI DI PALEOCOMUNITÁ BATIALI A MOLLUSCHI BENTONICI NEL PLIOCENE DELLA ROMAGNA; Quaderno di Studi e Notizie di Storia Naturale della Romagna,  26: 1–80 giugno 2008 ISSN 1123-6787
 Image of the shell in Erminio Caprotti, MALACOFAUNA DELLO STRATOTIPO PIACENZIANO (PLIOCENE DI CASTELL'ARQUATO); Conchilie 12 (1976)

crispata
Gastropods described in 1832